Counties (plural ) are the state administrative subdivisions of Estonia. Estonian territory is composed of 15 counties, including 13 on the mainland and 2 on islands. County governments were abolished at the end of 2017, with their duties split between state authorities and local governments, and nowadays counties have no noteworthy independent competences. Counties are composed of municipalities of two types: urban municipalities (towns) and rural municipalities (parishes), which are by law required to cooperate in development of their county.

List 
Population figures as of 2022. The sum total of the figures in the table is 42,644 km2, of which the land area is 42,388 km2, so that 256 km2 of water is included in the figures.

History 

In the first centuries AD, political and administrative subdivisions began to emerge in Estonia. Two larger subdivisions appeared: the parish (kihelkond) and the county (maakond). The parish consisted of several villages. Nearly all parishes had at least one fortress. The defence of the local area was directed by the highest official, the parish elder. The county was composed of several parishes, also headed by an elder. By the 13th century the following major counties had developed in Estonia: Saaremaa (Osilia), Läänemaa (Rotalia or Maritima), Harjumaa (Harria), Rävala (Revalia), Virumaa (Vironia), Järvamaa (Jervia), Sakala (Saccala), and Ugandi (Ugaunia).  Additionally there were several smaller elderships in central Estonia where danger of war was smallerVaiga, Mõhu, Nurmekund and Alempois. The exact number and borders of some elderships are disputed.

The first documented mentioning of Estonian political and administrative subdivisions comes from the Chronicle of Henry of Livonia, written in the 13th century during the Northern Crusades.

The autonomy of the Estonian counties and parishes ended after conquered and divided between Denmark, Livonian Order, Bishopric of Dorpat and Bishopric of Ösel-Wiek. The name of Rävala became Reval, replacing the name of an Estonian town Lindanisse, later Tallinn. Ugandi, Sakala and the smaller elderships disappeared from common usage.

In the 1580s, after the Livonian war as Sweden had conquered Northern Estonia, Harju, Järva, Lääne and Viru counties were officially formed there. Southern Estonia, which belonged to Poland 1582–1625, was divided into voivodships of Pärnu and Tartu; the island of Saaremaa belonged to Denmark until 1645. They all became counties as they went under Swedish rule.

This administrative system mostly remained as Estonia went under Russian rule due to the Northern War. In 1793 were formed Võru County in the south of Tartumaa, Viljandi County between Tartu and Pärnu counties, and Paldiski County in the west of Harjumaa. In 1796 Paldiski County was joined with Harjumaa again. Until 1888 Võrumaa and Viljandimaa were not wholly independent from Tartumaa and Pärnumaa, respectively.

Several changes were made to the borders of counties after Estonia became independent, most notably the formation of Valga County (from parts of Võru, Tartu and Viljandi counties) and Petseri County (area acquired from Russia with the 1920 Tartu peace treaty).

During Soviet rule, Petseri County became a part of Russia in 1945. Hiiumaa seceded from Läänemaa in 1946, Jõgevamaa from Tartumaa in 1949 and Jõhvimaa (modern Ida-Virumaa) from Virumaa in 1949. Counties were completely dissolved in 1950 as Estonian SSR was divided into raions (rajoonid) and (until 1953) oblasts. Until the 1960s, the borders of raions often changed until 15 of them were left. Out of them, Põlva and Rapla regions became separate, while the others were roughly corresponding to the pre-1950 counties.

Counties were re-established on 1 January 1990 in the borders of the Soviet-era raions. Due to the numerous differences between the current and historical (pre-1940) layouts, the historical borders are still used in ethnology, better representing cultural and linguistic differences.

County governments were abolished at the end of 2017, with their duties split between state authorities and local governments. Nowadays counties have no noteworthy independent competences, but local governments are required by law required to work together in developing their county.

See also 
 Flags of Estonian counties
 Coats of arms of Estonian Counties
 ISO 3166-2:EE
 Municipalities of Estonia
 Administrative reform in Estonia

References

External links 
 Local Government Reform Estonian Institute publication

 
Subdivisions of Estonia
Estonia, Counties
Estonia 1
Counties, Estonia
Estonia geography-related lists